Federación de Andinismo de Chile (FEACH) is an umbrella organization of Chilean mountaineering clubs. Founded in 1942 as Federación de Ski y Andinismo de Chile, it originally had six member clubs. In 1955, the skiing and the mountaineering sections were split and FEACH currently has more than 20 affiliated clubs around Chile.

Member clubs

References

External links
Federación de Andinismo de Chile - Official site
HISTORIA DE LA FEDERACIÓN DE SKI Y ANDINISMO Y DE LA FEDERACIÓN DE ANDINISMO Y EXCURSIONISMO DE CHILE

Clubs and societies in Chile
Climbing organizations
Alpine clubs
1942 establishments in Chile